The 2012 Horizon League baseball tournament took place from May 23 through 27.  All six of the league's teams met in the double-elimination tournament held at UIC's Les Miller Field.  Top seeded  won their first Horizon League Championship and earned the conference's automatic bid to the 2012 NCAA Division I baseball tournament.

Seeding
The league's six teams are seeded one through six based on winning percentage, using conference games only.

Results

All-Tournament Team
The following players were named to the All-Tournament Team.

Most Valuable Player
Mark Johnson was named Most Valuable Player of the Tournament.  Johnson was an outfielder for Valparaiso.

References

Tournament
Horizon League Baseball Tournament
Horizon League Baseball
Baseball in Illinois